Dandavati (ದಂಡಾವತಿ) is a river that flows through Sorab, India. It originates from a reservoir in Kattinakere. The Kattinakere reservoir's overflow canal turns into a creek gathering strength on its way to become the river Dandavati. The river flows via  Kuppe and joins the Varada river at a place called Bankasana near Anavatti. Varada, in turn, joins Tungabhadra and later Krishna River which finally joins the Bay of Bengal in the East coast of India. Sorab's Sri Ranganatha Temple is built on the bank of the Dandavati river.

Myth 
Old myth says that when Sri Ramachandra, Seetha and Lakamana were in exile, they travelled through Sorab. Seetha felt thirsty and Sri Ramachandra made a hole out of ground to find water. The water then became the river.

Dandavati(ದಂಡಾವತಿ) Reservoir Project
It has been planned to build a reservoir across the river Dandavati near Cheelanoor(ಚೀಲನೂರು) village of Sorab taluk. This Project  irrigates 50,500 acres of Agricultural and Forest land. Farmers who feared displacement from the project had staged protests and saying that the implementation of this project is non-viable but for political gains.

The controversy was used by the politicians during the Parliament and local bodies election also. Sources in the Department of Water Resource said the water level in the river that come under the Krishna valley need to be utilised as per the directions of Krishna Water Disputes Tribunal, there were legal hurdles in implementing the Dandavati project

The Dandavati Virodhi Horata Samiti which has launched a struggle against the project says the project is being implemented for political reasons. It questions the rationale behind irrigating dry lands by submerging fertile agricultural land and rain forest. Farmers says that If the government is so keen on irrigating the taluk, it should implement the Bythanala irrigation project which was planned in the Seventies.

References 
http://www.deccanherald.com/content/52815/row-over-dandavati.html
http://kannada.oneindia.in/topic/dandavati-project
http://www.thehindu.com/todays-paper/tp-national/tp-karnataka/article2734046.ece
http://www.deccanherald.com/content/65767/content/219231/content/218765/ipl-2012.html

Rivers of Karnataka
Geography of Shimoga district
Rivers of India